The Fujian Lightning is a Chinese professional men's basketball club based in Putian, Fujian, playing in the National Basketball League (NBL). Before 2017 the team was based in Chuzhou, Anhui.

Current roster

References

Sport in Fujian
Basketball teams in China